

 
Park Jin-woo (born March 15, 1996), better known by his stage name Jinjin (Hangul: 진진) is a South Korean rapper, singer, composer, dancer, and model. He debuted as the leader of the South Korean boy group Astro on February 23, 2016, under the label Fantagio. He was also a member of the duo Jinjin & Rocky until its disbandment from bandmate Rocky's departure due to not renewing his contract.

Early life 
Jinjin was born on March 15, 1996, in Seoul, South Korea. He attended and graduated from Hanlim Multi Art School with a focus on Practical Dance. He attended NY Dance Academy in Ilsan and participated in various dance competitions.

Career

2015: Pre-debut 
Jinjin was a trainee for 2 years in Fantagio before debuting with Astro. He was the 5th trainee to be officially introduced with the Fantagio iTeen Photo Test Cut. Before their debut, Jinjin along with the other 5 members of Astro had starred in a web-drama To Be Continued.

2016-2021: Debut with Astro and solo activities 

 
Jinjin debuted as part of the 6-member boy group Astro on February 23, 2016. Their first EP Spring Up has five songs including the title track "Hide & Seek".
 
In July 2016, Jinjin was featured in Eric Nam's song "Can't Help Myself" performance stages.
 
In November 2018, Jinjin was featured in tvN Asia's "Wok the World". Jinjin joined the cast in Hong Kong.
 
During Astro's "2nd ASTROAD To Seoul "Starlight"" concert which was last held on December 22–23, 2018, Jinjin performed "Mad Max" which he also composed. It was included in the DVD of the concert which was released in June 2019.
 
Jinjin alongside fellow Astro member MJ composed "Bloom", which is one of the side tracks in their first full album All Light which was released on January 16, 2019.
 
In March 2019, Jinjin and MJ took part in the travel variety show Go Together, Travel Alone for Celuv TV. The show was filmed in Saipan and includes Tony Ahn, Han Seung-yeon and Kim So-hye. It was later on released in a DVD format.
 
In July 2019, Jinjin and MJ competed in OGN's Game Dolympics.
 
In May 2020, Jinjin composed one of the side tracks in their seventh EP Gateway, titled "Lights On".
 
In March 2021, Jinjin began hosting the DIVE Studios podcast Unboxing alongside Pentagon's Kino.

In December 2021, Jinjin has been credited as a composer, lyricist and arranger of "Villain" — a single included in the first mini album for South Korean boy group Trendz.  Fantagio also confirmed in December that Jinjin and bandmate Rocky will form Astro’s second sub-unit called Jinjin & Rocky. They will debut with the extended play Restore on January 17, 2022.

2022: Sub-unit debut 
On January 17, Jinjin debuted as part of the duo Jinjin & Rocky with the EP Restore.

On December 30, Fantagio released an official statement and stated that Jinjin had decided to renew his contract with the agency.

Discography

Composition credits 
All credits are listed under the Korea Music Copyright Association unless otherwise stated.

Filmography

Web series

Television shows

Web shows

Podcast

Theater

Awards and nominations

Notes

References

External links 
 Jinjin on Fantagio

1996 births
Living people
South Korean male rappers
Astro (South Korean band) members
South Korean hip hop record producers
South Korean male singer-songwriters
21st-century South Korean male singers
South Korean male idols
K-pop singers
21st-century rappers
Hanlim Multi Art School alumni